The Obuasi Gold Mine is an underground gold mine situated near Obuasi, in the Ashanti Region of Ghana. It was at one time one of the world's ten largest gold mines.

In 2008, AngloGold Ashanti's Ashantiland operations, consisting of Obuasi and the Iduapriem Gold Mine, contributed 11% to the company's annual production. At its temporary closure in 2014 Obuasi had past gold production plus current resource of 62 million troy ounces.

History
There is a long history of mining in the area, with mining from the Ashanti region providing the gold for which the Gold Coast got its name. Large scale commercial and industrial mining began at Obuasi in 1897 with the formation of Ashanti Goldfields Corporation.

In 2004, Ashanti Goldfields merged with AngloGold to form AngloGold Ashanti. Following heavy losses mining was suspended in late 2014 with about 5,000 employees being laid off and the mine put into care and maintenance. During this time a large security force remained on site due to heavy pressure from local illegal miners. In 2016 an Obuasi employee was killed by a mob of illegal miners.

In 2018, after approvals were received from the Ghanaian Government, the decision was taken to recapitalise the Obuasi gold mine, with work beginning in 2019. The new mechanised mine had its first gold pour in December 2019 and began commercial production on 1 October 2020. It is planned to reach full production in 2022.

Production
Production figures of the recent past were:

 The 2004 results are for the eight months from May to December only
 The 2019 results are from the December startup only

See also
Geology of Ghana
Birimian
Gyimi River

References

External links 
 AngloGold Ashanti website
 Obuasi mine (GHA-00013) Secretariat of the African, Caribbean and Pacific Group of States website

Ashanti monarchy
Gold mines in Ghana
Surface mines in Ghana
Underground mines in Ghana
AngloGold Ashanti
Ashanti Region